Kosogor is the name of several rural localities in Russia:
Kosogor (Beloyevskoye Rural Settlement), Kudymkarsky District, Perm Krai, a village in Beloyevskoye Rural Settlement, Kudymkarsky District, Perm Krai
Kosogor (Leninskoye Rural Settlement), Kudymkarsky District, Perm Krai, a village in Leninskoye Rural Settlement, Kudymkarsky District, Perm Krai